Jagannathakam is a 2015 Telugu-language,  thriller drama film, produced by  Aadi Sesha Reddy Indupuru Rao under the banner  Chitrasouda and directed by Pradeep Nandan. It stars Pradeep Nandan and Khenisha Chandran.

Plot
Prudhvi (Pradeep Nandan) is a cheerful guy who lives with his father and sister (Ushasri). His only goal in life is to become an actor. One day he comes across Bhanu (Khenisha Chandran) and falls flat for her. As time passes, even Bhanu accept his love and the couple spend some happy times together. When everything seems to go well, he gets a huge break from acting in a big budget film. Exalted with that, Prudhvi organizes a party for all his friends. Partying, Prudhvi receives dreaded call that her father died. He quickly rushed home only to discover that her sister was kidnapped. What happened to his sister? How is his father's death? and  How does Prudhvi solve all his problems ? is the rest of the film.

Cast
Pradeep Nandan as Prudhvi  
Khenisaa Chandran as Bhanu
Abhinav Gomatam
Sivaji Raja as Police Officer
Usha Sri  as Divya
Kiran
Kedhar Shankar
Avinash as Banti
Pooja Jhaveri as Item Girl

Soundtrack

References

External links

2015 thriller drama films